This is a list of the first women lawyer(s) and judge(s) in Rhode Island. It includes the year in which the women were admitted to practice law (in parentheses). Also included are women who achieved other distinctions such becoming the first in their state to graduate from law school or become a political figure.

Firsts in state history

Lawyers 

First female to argue a case before the Rhode Island Supreme Court: Mary Ann Greene (1888; Massachusetts) in 1907 
First female: Ada Lewis Sawyer (1920) 
First African American female: Dorothy Crockett (1932)

Law Clerk 

 First female to clerk for Rhode Island's federal courts: Sandra L. Lynch (1971)

State judges 

 First female: Florence K. Murray (1942) in 1956  
 First female (district court): Corinne P. Grande in 1969 
 First female (Chief Justice; Rhode Island Superior Court): Florence K. Murray (1942) from 1978-1979  
 First female (Rhode Island Supreme Court): Florence K. Murray (1942) from 1979-1996  
 First openly lesbian female: Melissa Dubose in 2019  
First African American (female) (Rhode Island Supreme Court): Melissa A. Long in 2021

Federal judges 

 First African American female (U.S. Court of Appeals for the First Circuit): Ojetta Rogeriee Thompson (1976) in 2010  
 First female (United States Magistrate Judge; United States District Court, District of Rhode Island): Patricia Sullivan in 2012

Attorney General of Rhode Island 

 First female: Arlene Violet (1974) in 1985

Deputy Attorney General 

 First female: Susan E. McGuirl

United States Attorney 

First female: Margaret E. Curran (1983) from 1998-2003

Public Defender 

 First female: Mary S. McElroy in 2012

Political Office 

First female (senator): Florence K. Murray (1942) 
First openly lesbian female (Rhode Island Senate; Fifteenth District): Donna Nesselbush (c. 1991) in 2011

Rhode Island Bar Association 

 First female president: Beverly Glen Long from 1981-1982
First African American (female): Jametta Alston in 2004

Firsts in local history 
 Elizabeth Ortiz: First Latino American female to serve as a municipal court judge in Central Falls (2019) [Providence County, Rhode Island]
 Debra L. Chernick: First female President of the Washington County Bar Association, Rhode Island (2000-2004)

See also 

 List of first women lawyers and judges in the United States
 Timeline of women lawyers in the United States
 Women in law

Other topics of interest 

 List of first minority male lawyers and judges in the United States
 List of first minority male lawyers and judges in Rhode Island

References 

Lawyers, Rhode Island, first
Rhode Island, first
Women, Rhode Island, first
Women, Rhode Island, first
Women in Rhode Island
Lists of people from Rhode Island
Rhode Island lawyers